Elisa Camporese (born 16 March 1984) is an Italian former football midfielder, who most recently played for UPC Tavagnacco of Serie A. She has won four leagues with Foroni Verona, CF Bardolino and Torres CF. As a member of the Italy women's national team, she played at the 2005 and 2013 editions of the UEFA Women's Championship. In April 2019 she made her final appearance for UPC Tavagnacco and retired from football.

International career
Camporese made her senior debut for Italy on 10 October 2001, in a 3–1 home 2003 FIFA Women's World Cup qualification (UEFA) defeat by Russia. Included in the squad for UEFA Women's Euro 2005 in North West England, she played in all three games and scored in a 5–3 defeat by Norway as Italy made a group stage exit.

At UEFA Women's Euro 2009 in Finland, Camporese was not included in the squad as the Italians reached the quarter-finals. Four years later, national coach Antonio Cabrini named Camporese in his selection for UEFA Women's Euro 2013 in Sweden.

Honours
Torres Calcio
 Serie A:  2010–11
 Italian Women's Cup: 2010–11
 Italian Women's Super Cup: 2010, 2011

References

1984 births
Living people
Italian women's footballers
Italy women's international footballers
Serie A (women's football) players
A.S.D. AGSM Verona F.C. players
Torres Calcio Femminile players
Sportspeople from Padua
Women's association football midfielders
Footballers from Veneto
Foroni Verona F.C. players